The Kazakhstani Women's Cup (Áıelder arasyndaǵy Qazaqstan Kýbogy; Russian: Кубка Казахстана) is an annual women's football competition in Kazakhstan.

Format
In earlier seasons, unlike most cup competitions, the Kazakhstani Cup was a round-robin tournament and featured no knock-out system.

The 2014 cup was played over one week in Shymkent. Six teams were drawn into two groups of three. After a single round-robin, the top two teams per group advanced to the semi-finals.

Previous Cups

Title by team

References

External links
Women's section at federation website

Kaz
Women
2